Viju Khote (17 December 1941 – 30 September 2019) was an Indian actor who was known for his work in more than 440 films in Hindi and Marathi cinema. He was famous as the dacoit Kaalia in the film Sholay and the dialogue, "Sardar maine aapka namak khaya hai" and Robert in movie Andaz Apna Apna with the dialogue "galti se mistake hogaya". On television he was most remembered for his role in Zabaan Sambhalke (1993). He also acted in Marathi theatre over the years.

Personal life 
 
He was younger brother of actress Shubha Khote. Their father Nandu Khote was a noted stage actor and in silent movies, whose sister-in-law was actress Durga Khote.

Khote died on 30 September 2019 at his Mumbai home due to multiple organ failure at the age of 77.

Selected filmography

Marathi films

Television

References

External links

 Viju Khote at Bollywood Hungama

Indian male film actors
Male actors in Hindi cinema
Indian male television actors
Male actors in Marathi cinema
Male actors from Mumbai
1941 births
2019 deaths
Deaths from multiple organ failure